is a passenger railway station located in the city of Hikone, Shiga, Japan, operated by the West Japan Railway Company (JR West).

Lines

Station layout
The station consists of two opposed side platforms connected by an elevated station building. The station building is attended.

Platform

Adjacent stations

History
The station opened on 1 July 1920 as a station on the Japanese Government Railway (JGR) Tōkaidō Line, which became the Japan National Railways (JNR) after World War II. The station came under the aegis of the West Japan Railway Company (JR West) on 1 April 1987 due to the privatization of JNR. A new station building was completed in 2014.

Station numbering was introduced in March 2018 with Inae being assigned station number JR-A16.

Passenger statistics
In fiscal 2019, the station was used by an average of 2559 passengers daily (boarding passengers only).

Surrounding area
Seisen University / Seisen College Junior College

See also
List of railway stations in Japan

References

External links

JR West official home page

Railway stations in Japan opened in 1920
Railway stations in Shiga Prefecture
Tōkaidō Main Line
Hikone, Shiga